Tashmetum (cuneiform: 𒀭𒌨𒈨𒌈 Dur-me-tum, DTashmetu) is an Akkadian goddess, the consort of the god Nabu.

She is called upon to listen to prayers and to grant requests. Tashmetum and Nabu both shared a temple in the city of Borsippa, in which they were patron deities. Tashmetum's name means “the lady who listens”. She is also known as Tashmit and Tashmetu, and she was known by the epithets Lady of Hearing and Lady of Favor.

References

 Michael Jordan, Encyclopedia of Gods, Kyle Cathie Limited, 2002

External links
Ancient Mesopotamian Gods and Goddesses: Tašmetu (goddess)

Mesopotamian goddesses